Rabindra Sarobar is a station of the Kolkata Metro. It is situated on Shyama Prasad Mukherjee Road at Charu Chandra Avenue in Charu Market, Tollygunge. The station is named after Rabindra Sarobar, an artificial lake and the surrounding area of South Kolkata. It is followed by the station Mahanayak Uttam Kumar towards Kavi Subhash and is preceded by Kalighat station towards Noapara and Dum Dum.

The station

Structure
Rabindra Sarobar is underground metro station, situated on the Kolkata Metro Line 1 of Kolkata Metro.

Station layout

Connections

Bus
Bus route number 1A, 1B, 12C/1B, 21, 21/1, 40A, 40B, 41, 41B, 45B, 47/1, 47B, 80A, 205, 205A, 208, 228, 234/1, SD4, S112 (Mini), S113 (Mini), S114 (Mini), S117 (Mini), S135 (Mini), S188 (Mini), C2A, C8, C14/1, M7B, S2, S4, S4C, S6A, S7, S17A, S22, AC1, AC4B, AC6, AC47, V1, V9 etc. serve the station.

Train
Tollygunge railway station is adjacent to the station.

Tram
Tram route number 24/29 serves the station.

See also

Kolkata
List of Kolkata Metro stations
Transport in Kolkata
Kolkata Metro Rail Corporation
Kolkata Suburban Railway
Kolkata Monorail
Trams in Kolkata
Garia
Tollygunge
E.M. Bypass
List of rapid transit systems
List of metro systems

References

External links
 
 Official Website for line 1
 UrbanRail.Net – descriptions of all metro systems in the world, each with a schematic map showing all stations.

Kolkata Metro stations
Railway stations opened in 1986
Railway stations in Kolkata